School 87 is a public school building located near Downtown Buffalo, New York, located at 333 Clinton Street. The building served as home of Hutchinson Central Technical High School and the Buffalo Academy for Visual and Performing Arts as well as a junior high school and a swing school building for other Buffalo Public Schools that were being reconstructed from 2007 to 2013. It most recently housed the Middle Early College High School.

History 
School 87 was constructed in 1915 to house Technical High School, which had previously been housed at 102 Elm Street in School 11. The building was unique in that it was the only public school in Buffalo history to provide its own power and electricity by way of steam generations powered by high pressure boilers. These boilers provided electricity not only for Technical High, but for School 32, located across the street from the building. In 1954, Technical High School merged with Hutchinson Central High School and moved across town.

The old Technical High building was then designated as School 87 and re-opened as Clinton Junior High School (or Clinton Center School), making it one of the first junior high schools in the city and the only one to house grades seven and eight exclusively. Clinton Junior High was one of the most segregated schools in the City of Buffalo with a very high minority enrollment and along with other East Side high schools, was a frequent site of gang and racial violence during the 1960s and 1970s. In 1976, the school was converted to the Buffalo Academy for Visual and Performing Arts as part of Buffalo's desegregation plan. Beginning with Clinton's original student body, the newly renumbered School 187 eventually became a magnet school that enrolled students from all areas of the city.

In 2007, the Arts Academy moved to a new, renovated location at 450 Masten Avenue. School 87 housed South Park High School (2007-2009), Southside Elementary School (2009-2011), and The International Preparatory School (2011-2013) while those school's regular buildings were being renovated. After being vacant for the 2013–2014 school year, the building housed Middle Early College High School for one year. Currently, the school houses Buffalo Public Schools' Department of Curriculum, Instruction, and Assessment.

Former principals

References 

Buildings and structures in Buffalo, New York
Educational institutions established in 1915
Education in Buffalo, New York
Public middle schools in New York (state)
Schools in Buffalo, New York
1915 establishments in New York (state)